Pangomyia is a genus of flies in the family Stratiomyidae.

Distribution
Papua New Guinea.

Species
Pangomyia pallipes James, 1978
Pangomyia pictipes James, 1978

References

Stratiomyidae
Brachycera genera
Diptera of Australasia
Endemic fauna of Papua New Guinea